Colorado Group Limited was an Australian public company that operates a number of retail clothing chains. Major brands include Colorado Adventurewear, Mathers, Williams the Shoemen, JAG, Diana Ferrari, and Pairs. The company is based in Brisbane, Queensland with an office in Cremorne, Victoria. The history of the company dates back over 140 years to the 1864 founding of Williams in Ballarat, Victoria. In 2011, the company became known as Fusion Retail Brands.

 Colorado had 434 stores in Australia and New Zealand, and employed 3,800 people. It owed around 400 million to 18 financiers.

Colorado Group Limited was delisted from the Australian Securities Exchange on 15 August 2007 following the issue by ARH Investments of compulsory acquisition notices on 3 July 2007.

The Colorado clothing retail group went into receivership on 30 March 2011. Insolvency accounting specialists Ferrier Hodgson were placed in charge of the group. Colorado was owned by Affinity Equity Partners.

In June 2011 it was announced that the clothing chain was to "shut its doors" at the cost of 1,042 jobs. In Australia 100 underperforming Colorado stores shut, 21 Williams stores, 7 Mathers stores, 2 JAG stores and one Diana Ferrari store. In New South wales 42 stores closed, and in Victoria 27 closed. 9 Colorado Stores in New Zealand also closed.

Colorado ceased selling its clothing lines, returning to its beginning as a shoe brand which were sold through the company's Mathers and Williams the Shoemen stores, and online.

References

External links
Colorado Group Limited website

Companies based in Brisbane
Shoe companies of Australia
Retail companies established in 1864
Retail companies disestablished in 2011
1864 establishments in Australia
2011 disestablishments in Australia